The People's Champion or The People's Champ may refer to:

People
 Muhammad Ali, a professional American boxer, nicknamed "The People's Champion"
 Will Barton, a professional basketball player for the Denver Nuggets, nicknamed "The People's Champ"
 Dwayne Johnson, an American actor and wrestler, nicknamed "The People's Champion"
 Jack Walkling, an amateur golfer on the Wellfartogo Tour was nicknamed “The People’s Champ” by himself, much to the annoyance of fellow competitors Angus ‘rocket man’ Dunlop and Adam ‘Drive’ Cotterill
 Alex Higgins, an Irish former snooker player, nicknamed "The People's Champion"
 Freddie Mitchell, a former Philadelphia Eagles wide receiver, nicknamed "The People's Champ
 Tito Ortiz, an American mixed martial artist, nicknamed "The People's Champ"
 Tony Ferguson, an American mixed martial artist, also nicknamed The People's Champion
 Diamond Dallas Page, an American wrestler, nicknamed "The People's Champion"
 Michael Spinks, a professional American boxer, regarded as "The People's Champion" while going for the Tyson fight
 Gennady Golovkin, a professional Kazakh boxer, nicknamed "The People's Champ"
 David GrandPooBear Hunt, a prominent video game streamer and Red Bull athlete, nicknamed "The People's Champ"
 Manny Pacquiao, a Filipino politician and former professional boxer. Nicknamed "PacMan", he is regarded as one of the greatest professional boxers of all time, also nicknamed "The People's Champ"
 Ali Daei, an Iranian footballer extraordinaire known to a select few as "The People's Champion"
April O’Shea, Cook Community Award Recipient, 2nd in U14 Javelin 1989 OLMC, 4 marathons, Shire Identity, known publicly and on merchandise as “The People’s Champion”

Characters
 Kenny Powers (character), a fictional character from the HBO series Eastbound and Down, nicknamed "The People's Champion"

Music
 The Peoples Champ, an album by the American rapper Paul Wall
 "The People's Champ", a song by R.A. the Rugged Man from his 2013 album Legends Never Die
 "People's Champ", a song by Arkells from their 2018 album Rally Cry

Other uses
People's Champ Movement, Philippine political party led by Manny Pacquiao